Iowa Highway 70 (Iowa 70) is a state highway spanning  from north to south in eastern Iowa.  It begins at Iowa Highway 92 in Columbus Junction, and ends at U.S. Highway 6 in West Liberty.

Route description

It bypasses Columbus Junction to the north and east, then straightens out and crosses the Iowa River. As the Iowa River meanders away, the highway passes riverfront houses on the banks of the Cedar River. The Cedar also meanders away and Iowa 70 enters Conesville. It continues north towards Nichols, following an abandoned Burlington, Cedar Rapids and Northern Railway line. From the split with Iowa 22, Iowa 70 heads north towards West Liberty. Iowa 70 ends at an intersection with U.S. Highway 6 in West Liberty.

History
Iowa Highway 70 was created in 1969.  It replaced the former Iowa Highway 76 as that number was reassigned to a highway in northeastern Iowa.  The original route ran from Columbus City to West Liberty.  In the mid-1990s, a short bypass was built around Columbus Junction.  Iowa 70 traffic was rerouted onto the bypass where it ends today.  The old segment stayed remained in the primary highway system until July 1, 2003, when it was turned over to Louisa County.

Major intersections

References

External links

End of Iowa 70 at Iowa Highway Ends

070